Attilio Marcora (1899 – 1979) was an Italian footballer who played as a forward. On 6 November 1921, he represented the Italy national football team on the occasion of a friendly match against Switzerland in a 1–1 away draw.

References

1899 births
1979 deaths
Italian footballers
Italy international footballers
Association football forwards
Aurora Pro Patria 1919 players
S.S.D. Varese Calcio players